The 1905 Tsetserleg earthquake occurred in or near the Tsetserleg Sum of Khövsgöl Province in Mongolia on 9 July 1905. The earthquake has been estimated at 7.9 to 8.3 on the moment magnitude scale.

Background

The Tsetserleg earthquake is believed to be a strike-slip rupture of a branch of the Bolnai Fault, extending about 190 km. The fault displacement during the earthquake was greater than 5 m, and the duration is estimated at about one minute. However, this interpretation is contested; field surveys after the earthquake show a complex rupture not necessarily characteristic of a strike-slip mechanism.

The Tsetserleg earthquake was followed two weeks later by the Bolnai earthquake, and is considered a part of the same general crustal movement.

Damage

There are few records of the immediate effects of the earthquake due to the remoteness of Mongolia in 1905. However, rockslides were reported in the nearby mountains, and supposedly "two lakes, each of eight acres in size, disappeared".

Popular culture 
Lasting damage to the landscape from the earthquake can be seen in the season 3 Mongolia special of the Amazon Prime motoring show The Grand Tour.

See also
 List of earthquakes in 1905

References

External links

1905 earthquakes
Earthquakes in Mongolia
1905 in China
1905 disasters in Asia
1905 disasters in China 
1905 disasters in Mongolia
1905 in Mongolia